Azizullah is an Arabic male name built on the words Aziz and Allah, it may refer to:

Given name
 Azizollah Zarghami (born 1884), Iranian Major General
 Azizullah (born 1993), Pakistani cricketer
 Aziz Ullah Haidari (1968–2001), Afghan journalist
 Azizullah Karzai, Afghan diplomat
 Azizullah Lodin (1939–2015), Afghan politician
, Iranian Director
, Iranian Actor
Azizollah Khoshvaght, Iranian-Azeri Cleric

Arabic masculine given names